Michael Schad (born October 4, 1963) is a former Canadian American football offensive lineman in the National Football League and is currently a mortgage banker with CMG Financial located in Mt. Laurel, New Jersey.

He was drafted by the Los Angeles Rams with the 23rd pick of the 1986 NFL Draft. He attended Moira Secondary school in Belleville, Ontario. He played his college football at Queen's University in Canada.  He is the only player in U Sports football history to be selected in the first round of an NFL Draft. In 1986, he won the J. P. Metras Trophy which is presented annually to the top down lineman in university football in Canada.

He played a total of 62 games with the Rams and the Philadelphia Eagles, before returning to Canada in 1995 to play one year with the CFL's Ottawa Rough Riders.

References

External links
Database Football

1963 births
Living people
Canadian players of American football
Los Angeles Rams players
Philadelphia Eagles players
Sportspeople from Belleville, Ontario
American football offensive linemen
Canadian football offensive linemen
Queen's Golden Gaels football players
Ottawa Rough Riders players
Players of Canadian football from Ontario